Xylota nebulosa is a species of hoverfly in the family Syrphidae.

Distribution
United States: Texas, New Mexico

References

Eristalinae
Insects described in 1921
Diptera of North America
Hoverflies of North America
Taxa named by Charles Willison Johnson